Roseway (1916 – 1936) was a British Thoroughbred racehorse and broodmare. She showed promise as a juvenile in 1918 when she won twice and was second twice from seven starts. In the following spring she produced by far her best performance when she won the 1000 Guineas by six lengths. She finished second when odds-on favourite for the Oaks Stakes but ran poorly in two subsequent races and was retired from racing at the end of the year. She had some success as a broodmare both in Britain and in the United States.

Background
Roseway was a brown mare bred and owned by the newspaper proprietor Edward Hulton. She was trained by Frank Hartigan at Weyhill in Hampshire.

Her sire Stornoway was at his best as a two-year-old in 1913 when his wins included the Gimcrack Stakes. He ran only once subsequently and sired Roseway in his first season at stud. Roseway's dam Rose of Ayrshire produced several good broodmares and was the female-line ancestor of the Irish Derby winner Steel Pulse and the Argentinian champion Telescopico.

Racing career

1918: two-year-old season
Roseway began her racecourse career at Newmarket Racecourse in June when she won the Home-bred Two-year-old Plate. In the following month at the same track she followed up by taking the Isleham Plate from Sunny Rhyme. Her two wins that summer earned her owner a total of £589. On her return at Newmarket in October she started 15/8 second favourite for the Buckenham Stakes and finished second, beaten a head by Lord Basil, a highly-rated colt from the Alec Taylor, Jr. stable. In the course of the season, Roseway also finished second in the Barton Mills Nursery Handicap and ran unplaced on three occasions.

1919: three-year-old season
On 9 May, Roseway started the 2/1 favourite ahead of fourteen opponents for the 106th running of the 1000 Guineas over the Rowley Mile course. Ridden by Albert "Snowy" Whalley she won by six lengths from  Britannia with Glaciale a length and a half away in third place. Roseway's winning margin was the second widest of the 20th century, behind only Humble Duty's seven length win in 1970.

Steve Donoghue took the ride when Roseway started the 4/7 favourite for the Oaks Stakes over one and a half miles at Epsom Racecourse on 6 June. She took the lead in the straight but was overtaken inside the final furlong and was beaten one and a half lengths by Bayuda. At Royal Ascot later in June, Roseway was beaten by the King's colt Viceroy in the Waterford Stakes over one mile. In July she started the 8/13 favourite for the Falmouth Stakes at Newmarket but finished last of the five runners behind Tomatina. By the end of July the filly had earned £4,814 in prize money.

Roseway reportedly became "unreliable" in late 1919 and at the end of the year Hulton sold her to Sir George Greenhill who retired her from racing to become a broodmare.

Assessment and honours
In their book, A Century of Champions, based on the Timeform rating system, John Randall and Tony Morris rated Roseway a "poor" winner of the 1000 Guineas.

Breeding record
Roseway produced at least two foals in Britain and at least six more after her export to the United States. Roseway died in 1936.

Roseola, a black filly, foaled in 1923, sired by Swynford. Dam of Tornado, winner of the Prix Lupin, Prix des Sablons, Prix Jean Prat.
Heatherway, brown colt, 1924, by Craig an Eran
Phalara (USA), brown filly, 1926, by Phalaris
Arbor (USA), chestnut filly, 1930, by Fair Play
Entwine (USA), bay mare, 1932, by Chance Shot
Rushaway (USA), black gelding, 1933 by Haste. Won Illinois Derby, Latonia Derby, Louisiana Derby.
Queen Full (USA), chestnut filly, 1934 by Jack High
Hard Times (USA), brown colt, 1936 by Sickle

Pedigree

Roseway was inbred 3 × 4 to Hampton, meaning that this stallion appears in both the third and fourth generations of her pedigree. She was also inbred 4 × 4 to Galopin.

References

1916 racehorse births
1936 racehorse deaths
Racehorses bred in the United Kingdom
Racehorses trained in the United Kingdom
Thoroughbred family 1-s
1000 Guineas winners